Upper Conference is a town in Saint Andrew Parish, Grenada.  It is located towards the northern end of the island, along the eastern coast.

References 

Populated places in Grenada
Saint Andrew Parish, Grenada